Jannik Kohlbacher (born 19 July 1995) is a German handball player for Rhein-Neckar Löwen and the German national team.

He participated at the 2016 European Men's Handball Championship.

References

External links

1995 births
Living people
German male handball players
HSG Wetzlar players
Rhein-Neckar Löwen players
Handball-Bundesliga players
Handball players at the 2020 Summer Olympics